Peter LeBlanc (born February 3, 1988) is a Canadian professional ice hockey forward who is currently playing for the Essen Mosquitoes of the German Oberliga. He has formerly played a solitary game in the National Hockey League (NHL) with the Washington Capitals.

Playing career
As a youth, Leblanc played in the 2002 Quebec International Pee-Wee Hockey Tournament with a minor ice hockey team from Hamilton, Ontario.

Selected by the Chicago Blackhawks 186th overall in the 2006 NHL Entry Draft, Leblanc was assigned to AHL affiliate, the Rockford IceHogs. During the 2012–13 season, LeBlanc was traded by the Blackhawks to the Washington Capitals for future considerations in AHL contracted player Matt Beaudoin on January 31, 2013.

In July 2013, LeBlanc was re-signed by the Capitals to a one-year, two-way contract. He was reassigned to AHL affiliate, the Hershey Bears, for the duration of the 2013–14 season, scoring 12 goals and 28 points in 65 games. LeBlanc was recalled by the Capitals and made his NHL debut in their final regular season game in a 1–0 shootout defeat by the Tampa Bay Lightning on April 13, 2014.

As a pending free agent, LeBlanc opted to sign his first European contract on a one-year deal with Swedish club, Rögle BK of the HockeyAllsvenskan on June 12, 2014. In the 2014–15 season, LeBlanc was unable to contribute to his expectations with 18 points in 50 contests. LeBlanc opted to remain in Europe the following season, signing with top flight Finnish outfit, HPK of the Liiga.

Following a single season with HPK as a depth forward in 2015–16, LeBlanc returned to North America, signing a one-year deal with the Cincinnati Cyclones of the ECHL on September 14, 2016.

After a short spell with the Manchester Monarchs, LeBlanc agreed to a move to the Fife Flyers of the United Kingdom's Elite Ice Hockey League on June 30, 2017.

Career statistics

Awards and honours

References

External links

1988 births
Living people
Canadian ice hockey left wingers
Canadian expatriate ice hockey players in Austria
Canadian expatriate ice hockey players in Scotland
Canadian expatriate ice hockey players in Finland
Canadian expatriate ice hockey players in Sweden
Chicago Blackhawks draft picks
Cincinnati Cyclones (ECHL) players
Essen Mosquitoes players
Fife Flyers players
Hershey Bears players
HPK players
Ice hockey people from Ontario
Manchester Monarchs (ECHL) players
New Hampshire Wildcats men's ice hockey players
Rockford IceHogs (AHL) players
Rögle BK players
Sportspeople from Hamilton, Ontario
Toledo Walleye players
Washington Capitals players
EK Zell am See players
Canadian expatriate ice hockey players in the United States
Canadian expatriate ice hockey players in Germany